A list of films produced in Israel in the 2010s.

Israeli films of the 2010s by year

2010

2011

2012

2013

2014

2015

2016

2017

2018

2019

See also 
 Cinema of Israel

External links
 Israeli film at the Internet Movie Database

Lists of 2010s films
Films